Tragostoma is a monotypic beetle genus in the family Cerambycidae described by Per Olof Christopher Aurivillius in 1914. Its only species, Tragostoma imperator, was described by the same author in the same year.

References

Tragocephalini
Beetles described in 1914
Monotypic beetle genera